The New Virginians was a musical group from Virginia Tech founded in 1972.  Its founder and first director was Stan Kingma, who had directed the Virginia Tech Glee Club, later called the Showmen, which was the nucleus of choral music singing at Virginia Tech.  The group featured 24 singer/dancers, a 12 piece showband, a technical staff and a public-relations staff focused on a musical variety show which toured Virginia and surrounding states as "musical ambassadors of Virginia Tech" in shows hosted by civic groups, conventioneers, and sometimes the university itself.  The group was known on campus for its annual "Homeshow" which was presented each spring and Christmas show during the holiday which benefited a local charity.

During those 21 years, the group produced 17 albums and performed a cross country summer tour sponsored by Georgia Pacific in the late 1970s which concluded with an appearance on the Dinah Shore Show.  Georgia Pacific president and former Virginia Tech president T. Marshall Hahn was instrumental in arranging the tour. Stan Kingma, who directed the group for its first six years, and most of the original New Virginians staff and originators (Stan Kingma and Christopher "Kit" Bond) left the program at the end of the 1978 season.  After a year of inactivity, the University restarted the program in 1979 under the direction of John Howell where it continued until the end of the 1993 spring semester when John Howell founded and directed the Early Music Ensemble at Virginia Tech. Founding member Associate Professor of Music Emeritus Paul Breske led the showband until his death in 1992.

Reorganization
The group was reorganized in 1994 as a 12-member Jazz Choir under the direction of Lisanne Lyons.  The new group also disbanded the showband, replacing it with a rhythm quartet of student musicians playing guitar, piano, bass and drums.  That instrumental group was later replaced with prerecorded musical accompaniment.   The group continued in the Jazz Choir format for 10 years, winning the Downbeat Award two years in a row for the most outstanding jazz choir in the United States. University budget cuts in 2004 forced the loss of all vocal and instrumental jazz professors and the group was completely disbanded bringing a close to the 30+ year history of groups under the New Virginians name.

Reunions
In July 2007, over 100 Alumni from the Kingma years came together in Richmond, Va for a reunion celebrating the 35th anniversary of the founding of the group.  Alumni stepped back into the tasks they performed so many times as students as technicians set the stage, and singers and band members performed for the community.

Discography

Notable alumni
 Chil Kong - Artistic Director of the Northwest Asian American Theater, Performer 1987-1991
 Nancy Glisson Lucy - 1993 Miss Virginia, 4th runner to 1993 Miss America, Performer, 1988-1992
 Bob Lambert - Lighting director in the late 1970s, later worked for Disney Imagineering, rising to become a senior executive with The Walt Disney Company.
 Joan Grady (Gardner) - 1975 Miss Virginia, Miss Virginia Beach {12}
 Pamela Polk - 1976 Miss Virginia (1976  	Top Ten Finalist, Talent Winner in Miss America Pageant) {12}

References

External links
 New Virginians Alumni website
 New Virginians videos on YouTube

Virginia Tech
Virginia Tech music
Musical groups established in 1972
1972 establishments in Virginia
Musical groups disestablished in 1993
1993 disestablishments in Virginia
Musical groups established in 1994
1994 establishments in Virginia
Musical groups disestablished in 2004
2004 disestablishments in Virginia